Touch Memory (or contact memory) is an electronic identification device packaged in a coin-shaped stainless steel container.  Touch memory is accessed when a touch probe comes into contact with a memory button.

Read and/or write operations between the probe and memory chip are performed with just a momentary contact. Thousands of reads and writes can be performed with a single chip and data integrity can last over 100 years.

Touch memory complements such technologies as bar codes, RFID tags, magnetic stripe, proximity cards and smart cards.

Uses
Touch memory is used in such areas as
 Access control
 Asset management
 eCash
 Gaming systems
 Thermochron applications
 Time and attendance

Examples
The US Postal Service uses touch memory for tracking collection times on its large collection boxes. Healthcare, transportation, and trade show organizations also use the technology.

Advantages
Unlike bar codes and magnetic stripe cards, many touch memory solutions can be written to as well as being read. Communication rate, and product breadth, of touch memory goes well beyond the simple memory products typically available with RFID. The durability of the stainless-steel-clad touch memory is much greater than the thin plastic of a smart card.

See also 
 1-Wire protocol

References

Automatic identification and data capture
Radio-frequency identification